Dyersburg State Community College is a public community college in Dyersburg, Tennessee. It was founded in 1969 and is operated by the Tennessee Board of Regents.

History
Dyersburg was chosen by the Tennessee State Board of Education in 1967 as the location for the second community college in western Tennessee as part of the state's response to the 1957 Pierce-Albright report to the state's Legislative Council, which led to a plan to place a postsecondary institution within a 30-50 mile of each Tennessee resident. Classes began in 1969 and its first graduates completed degrees in 1971. Its center in Trenton first offered classes in 1991, and the Covington center was founded in 1992.

Academics
Classes are held on the 100-acre campus in Dyersburg and at centers in Covington and Trenton. The college offers Associate of Science, Associate of Arts, and Associate of Applied Science degrees as well as technical and academic certificates. Dyersburg State Community College serves seven counties adjacent to or near the Mississippi River in West Tennessee. The school is accredited by the Southern Association of Colleges and Schools. As of 2022, the college is open-admission.

References

External links
Official website

Community colleges in Tennessee
Dyersburg State Community College
Educational institutions established in 1969
Education in Dyer County, Tennessee
Universities and colleges accredited by the Southern Association of Colleges and Schools
Buildings and structures in Dyer County, Tennessee
Education in Tipton County, Tennessee
Education in Gibson County, Tennessee
1969 establishments in Tennessee
NJCAA athletics